Annie Putnam  (October 18, 1679 – 1716) was a primary accuser at the Salem Witch Trials of Massachusetts during the later portion of 17th-century Colonial America. Born 1679 in Salem Village, Essex County, Massachusetts Bay Colony, she was the eldest child of Thomas (1652–1699) and Ann (Née Carr) Putnam (1661–1699).

She was friends with some of the girls who claimed to be afflicted by witchcraft and, in March 1692, proclaimed to be afflicted herself, along with Elizabeth Hubbard, Mary Walcott, Mercy Lewis, Abigail Williams, and Mary Warren. Putnam is responsible for the accusations of 62 people, which, along with the accusations of others, resulted in the executions of twenty people, as well as the deaths of several others in prison.

She was a first cousin once removed of Generals Israel and Rufus Putnam.

Early life
Annie was born on October 18, 1679, to Thomas Putnam (of the Putnam family) and Ann (née Carr) Putnam, who had twelve children in total. Ann was the eldest. Fellow accuser Mercy Lewis was a servant in the Putnam household, and Mary Walcott was, perhaps, Annie's best friend. These three girls would become the first afflicted girls outside of the Parris household.

The Putnam family lived on the southwest side of Hathorne Hill, approximately in the area of what is today Danielle Drive in Danvers, Massachusetts. (For many years, a house that stands back from Putnam Lane was misidentified as the Putnam House, but this house was likely built circa 1891. Images of this house are still routinely misidentified as Annie's home). Shortly after the trials were over, the family built a new house in the general area of what is today Dayton and Maple Streets in Danvers where Annie spent the rest of her life.

Salem witch trials

Annie was one of the "afflicted girls", the primary accusers during the trials.

Aftermath
According to Upham, and implied by her own will, Annie was chronically ill in the years after the trials, and that led to her death at a young age.

When both her parents died in 1699, Putnam was left to raise her nine surviving siblings. She never married.

In 1706, Ann Putnam publicly apologized for the part she had played in the witch trials, the only one of the accusers to do so:

The surviving victims of the witch trials, and the families of those who had been executed as a result of her accusations,  accepted her apology and were reconciled with her.

Death
She died in 1716 and is buried with her parents in an unmarked grave in Danvers, Massachusetts. Her will entered probate on June 29, 1716, so she presumably died shortly before then. In it, she refers to eight surviving siblings. Her four brothers inherited the land she had inherited from her parents, and her personal estate was divided between her four sisters.

In popular culture

In Arthur Miller's play The Crucible, her character's name is Ruth, to avoid confusion with her mother, Ann Putnam (Sr.)

Conversion by Katherine Howe describes the mass hysteria of the fictional St. Joan's Academy in Danvers, Massachusetts, interlaced with intercalary chapters from Annie's perspective as she tells the town's new reverend how the witch hunt began and escalated based on her testimony and the testimonies of the other girls. The novel explores the occurrence of modern-day hysteria through juxtaposition against the Salem Witch Trials.

References

Sources
 Biography of Ann Putnam Jr., umkc.edu; accessed December 23, 2014.

1679 births
1716 deaths
Accusers in witch trials
Colonial American women
People of the Salem witch trials
Place of death missing
Ann